Hoste is a village and municipality in Galanta District of  the Trnava Region of south-west Slovakia.

History
In historical records the village was first mentioned in 1231.

Geography
The municipality lies at an elevation of 126 metres and covers an area of 4.485 km². It has a population of about 504 people.

Genealogical resources

The records for genealogical research are available at the state archive "Statny Archiv in Bratislava, Slovakia"

 Roman Catholic church records (births/marriages/deaths): 1688-1895 (parish B)
 Lutheran church records (births/marriages/deaths): 1701-1896 (parish B)

See also
 List of municipalities and towns in Slovakia

References

External links

 Official page
https://web.archive.org/web/20070513023228/http://www.statistics.sk/mosmis/eng/run.html
Surnames of living people in Hoste

Villages and municipalities in Galanta District